Joe Sykes may refer to:

 Trumaine Sykes (born 1982), known as Joe, American football defensive end 
 Joe Sykes (footballer), English footballer